Elvin Ng Choon Siong (born 23 December 1980) is a Singaporean actor and former model.

Early life
Ng attended Jurong Primary School, Catholic High School and National Junior College. He graduated with an honours degree in English literature from the National University of Singapore.

Career
Ng was discovered through a talent search programme School Belle and the Beau hosted by MediaCorp DJ and Host, Dennis Chew and Belinda Lee, during his university days. They were filming the variety show at National University of Singapore where Ng studies at and his performance and looks caught the attention of the producers at MediaCorp. Ng was then given a supporting role in the 2005 series A Life of Hope where he acted alongside Joanne Peh, and after the airing of the series, MediaCorp offered Ng a contract with them.

Subsequently, Ng received two nominations at the Star Awards 2006, but lost the Most Popular Newcomer award to Kelvin Tan Weilian.

He won the Star Awards for All-Time Favourite Artiste after winning the Top 10 Most Popular Male Artistes Award 10 times from 2006 to 2016. He won the Rocket Award for the biggest breakthrough at the Star Awards 2010 after making the "Top 10 Most Popular Male Artistes" list three consecutive times and earning a Best Actor nomination for his performance as a young man with autism in the series Breakout and also he was nominated for best on-screen couple with Zhou Ying in the same year.

In 2008, Dai Xiangyu replaced him, who was originally selected but was injured just prior to the filming, to play the role of Yamamoto Yousuke, in the drama series, The Little Nyonya.

Filmography

Television

Film

Bibliography
Our Epic Little Lives (伟大的卑微; 2013)

Awards and nominations

References

External links
Elvin Ng's personal blog

Singaporean people of Hokkien descent
Singaporean male television actors
21st-century Singaporean male actors
Catholic High School, Singapore alumni
National Junior College alumni
National University of Singapore alumni
Living people
1980 births